Anatoly Alexandrovich Romanov (born September 27, 1948 in Mikhailovka, Belebeyevsky District, Bashkortostan) is a Russian Colonel-General, a former deputy interior minister - the commander of the Russian Interior Ministry and the Commander of the Joint Group of Federal Forces in Chechnya, Hero of the Russian Federation. 1995 - Deputy Minister of Internal Affairs of the Russian Federation - the commander of the Interior Troops of the Russian Interior Ministry.

Assassination Attempt 
On October 6, 1995, in Grozny in the area of a tunnel under the railway bridge, a radio-controlled bomb exploded. The car in which Romanov was riding was in the center of the explosion. Romanov was seriously injured, miraculously survived, but was left disabled  (Romanov went to the meeting to Khasbulatov).

References

External links
Site  Heroes of the country
 biography
 Fund to promote sports and medicine named after Hero of Russia Colonel General   Romanov

1948 births
Living people
Russian colonel generals
Heroes of the Russian Federation
Recipients of the Order of Military Merit (Russia)
People with disorders of consciousness